The Blackshare Formation is a  geologic formation exposed in the Hagan Basin west of the Ortiz Mountains of New Mexico. It is estimated be to of Miocene age.

Description
The Blackshare Formation consists primarily of sandstone and conglomerate with minor mudstone. The conglomerate forms lenticular bodies, with clasts consisting mostly of Ortiz porphyry with small amounts of hornfels and chert. The sandstone layers tends to be more coarse at their base. The dip of the beds (which is to the northeast) decreases from 16 degrees to 1 degree from the base to the top of the formation. Paleocurrents confirm deposition by stream flow from the Ortiz Mountains to the east.

The formation is divided into four informal members, described as a sandstone facies, a conglomeratic sandstone facies, a conglomerate facies, and a muddy sandstone facies. The formation interfingers with the underlying Tanos Formation and is overlain with angular unconformity by the Tuerto Formation.

The formation is interpreted as deposition by streams flowing from the east into a closed basin. The progressive tilting of the beds, with the lower beds showing significant dip while the uppermost are nearly horizontal, may be connected to the uplift of the Sandia Mountains to the south while the sediments making up the formation were being deposited.

History
The beds making up this formation were first assigned to the Santa Fe Formation by Stearns in 1953. They were designated as the Blackshare Formation of the Santa Fe Group by Connell et al. in 2002.

References

Bibliography 
 
 
 
 
 

Neogene formations of New Mexico